Pierre J.J. Georges Adelard Gimaïel (born 6 June 1949 in Metabetchouan, Quebec) was a Liberal party member of the House of Commons of Canada. He was a manpower consultant and development manager by career.

He won only one term of office in the 32nd Canadian Parliament after winning the Lac-Saint-Jean riding in the 1980 federal election. Gimaïel was defeated in his campaigns during the 1984 and 1988 federal elections.

External links
 

1949 births
Living people
Members of the House of Commons of Canada from Quebec
Liberal Party of Canada MPs